Pronothobranchius is a genus of aplocheilid fish native to western Africa.

Species
There are currently four recognized species in this genus:
 Pronothobranchius chirioi Valdesalici, 2013
 Pronothobranchius gambiensis (Svensson, 1933)
 Pronothobranchius kiyawensis (C. G. E. Ahl, 1928)
 Pronothobranchius seymouri (Loiselle & Blair, 1972)

References

Nothobranchiidae
Freshwater fish genera